"Ma, I Don't Love Her" is the third official single from the Clipse off their album Lord Willin'. It features Faith Evans and was produced by The Neptunes.

In 2003 "Ma, I Don't Love Her" peaked at number 86 on The Billboard Hot 100 and number 40 on the Hot R&B/Hip-Hop Singles & Tracks Charts.

Charts

Release history

References

2002 singles
2002 songs
Clipse songs
Faith Evans songs
Arista Records singles
Song recordings produced by the Neptunes
Songs written by Pusha T
Songs written by Pharrell Williams
Songs written by Chad Hugo